Ricciotti is both an Italian surname and a masculine Italian given name. Notable people with the name include:

 Abbot Giuseppe Ricciotti, C.R.L., (1890–1964), Italian canon regular, Biblical scholar and archeologist
 Ricciotti Garibaldi (1847–1924), Italian soldier, the fourth son of Giuseppe Garibaldi and Anita Garibaldi
 Ricciotti Greatti (born 1939), Italian former footballer
 Rudy Ricciotti (born 1952), French architect and publisher

See also
 Ricciotto Canudo

Italian-language surnames
Italian masculine given names